Elvira Rafailovna Misbakhova (Tatar Cyrillic: Эльвира Рафаил кызы Мисбахова; born July 20, 1975) is a Volga Tatar born Russian / Canadian violist and violinist. Misbakhova is presently Associate Principal Viola at the Orchestre Métropolitain of
Montreal, Trois-Rivières Symphony Orchestra and the Longueuil Symphony Orchestra.

Early life
Misbakhova was born and raised in Nizhnekamsk,  in the Republic of Tatarstan, Russia. She is the second child of Rafail Misbakhov and Nurlybika Misbakhova (Saitova).
Misbakhova studied violin at the Nizhnekamsk Music School N1, Nizhnekamsk Music College and Kazan Conservatory, graduating in 1999. In 1996, when she was appointed Associate Viola at Kazan Chamber Orchestra La Primavera, she began to tour extensively in Europe. 
In 1999, Misbakhova, following her husband Airat Ichmouratov, permanently moved to Montreal, Quebec, Canada and participated as a student in the Orford Arts Centre Festival, where she met Yuli Turovsky, Soviet-born Canadian cellist and conductor, and his wife violinist Eleonora Turovsky, who later became Misbakhova's teacher.

Career

In 2000, Misbakhova joined the klezmer group Kleztory, in which she presently plays violin. In 2004, Kleztory recorded for the Chandos Records (Great Britain) CD with I Musici de Montréal Chamber Orchestra and Yuli Turovsky. In 2007 Kleztory's album "Nomade" won the Opus Prize. Most recent (2014) Album "Arrival" was nominated as Best album of the year in Traditional music category by ADISQ. In 2012 Kleztory won klezmer Furth Prize at the International Klezmer Festival and Competition in Amsterdam and as a result appeared at the Furth Klezmer Festival during the following spring
. With Kleztory, Elvira Misbakhova has appeared as soloist with several orchestras, including the Montreal Symphony Orchestra, the Quebec Symphony Orchestra, I Musici de Montréal Chamber Orchestra, Les Violons du Roy and Brussels Chamber Orchestra and toured intensively in Canada, USA, Brazil, Mexico, Costa Rica, Germany, the Netherlands, Austria, Romania and China.

As viola soloist, she has performed with I Musici de Montreal, the Orchestre Métropolitain, the University of Montreal Symphony Orchestra, the New Generation Chamber Orchestra, and the Multicultural
Orchestra of Montreal, where she performed the Canadian premiere of Requiem "Holocaust" for viola and orchestra by Boris Pigovat. She has performed with the Orford Camerata and McGill Chamber Orchestras, the Bachacademie Symphony Orchestra in Stuttgart, Germany (2002), and in the
Pacific Music Festival Orchestra in Sapporo, Japan (2002).

In 2013 Misbakhova founded the Turovsky String Quartet to honour the passionate and inspiring Yuli and Eleonora Turovsky. Together with violinists Anastasia Virlan, Robert Margaryan, and cellist Katherina Bragina, they continue to play at
chamber music series and festivals in Montreal and throughout Quebec.

Education
Elvira Misbakhova obtained her Master's degree (2001) and Doctorate degree (2006) in Interpretation (Viola) at University of Montreal, where she studied with Eleonora Turovsky.

Personal life
Misbakhova is married to composer and conductor Airat Ichmouratov, and they have two daughters.

References

External links
The Orchestre Métropolitain 
Kleztory klezmer group

Klezmer musicians
Tatar people
1975 births
Living people
Canadian classical violinists
Canadian women violinists and fiddlers
People from Nizhnekamsk
Russian classical violinists
Russian classical violists
Women violists
Canadian classical violists
Université de Montréal alumni
21st-century Canadian women musicians
21st-century classical violinists
Women classical violinists
21st-century Canadian violinists and fiddlers